Gil Shaham (Hebrew: גיל שחם; born February 19, 1971) is an American violinist of Israeli Jewish descent.

Biography
Gil Shaham was born in Urbana, Illinois, while his Israeli parents were on an academic fellowship at the University of Illinois. His father Jacob was an astrophysicist and his mother Meira Diskin was a cytogeneticist. His sister is the pianist Orli Shaham. His brother Shai Shaham is the head of the Laboratory of Developmental Genetics at Rockefeller University.

Gil Shaham is a graduate of the Horace Mann School in New York. When he was two the family moved to Jerusalem, where he started violin lessons at the Rubin Academy of Music aged seven, winning annual scholarships from the America-Israel Cultural Foundation. He subsequently attended Aspen Music Festival and School in Colorado, studying with Dorothy DeLay and Jens Ellermann, and won a scholarship to the Juilliard School. He and his sister Orli also studied at Columbia University.

Shaham lives in New York City and teaches at Bard College Conservatory of Music. He is married to violinist Adele Anthony. They have three children.

Music career
Shaham debuted as soloist with the Jerusalem Symphony at age 10. He performed with the Israel Philharmonic, Israel's foremost orchestra, less than a year later. Shaham won first prize in the Claremont Competition aged 11, and was admitted to Juilliard, where he studied with Dorothy DeLay and Hyo Kang.

Shaham's career advanced in 1989 when, while a senior at Horace Mann, he replaced an ailing Itzhak Perlman to perform the Bruch and Sibelius violin concertos with the London Symphony Orchestra at the Royal Festival Hall.

Shaham won the Avery Fisher Career Grant in 1990, and the Premio Internazionale of the Accademia Chigiana in Siena in 1992.

Shaham has performed with many leading orchestras, including the New York Philharmonic, Berlin Philharmonic, Toronto Symphony Orchestra, Vienna Philharmonic, Israel Philharmonic Orchestra, Chicago Symphony Orchestra, Boston Symphony Orchestra, Los Angeles Philharmonic, Russian National Orchestra, Academy of St. Martin in the Fields, San Francisco Symphony Orchestra, Philadelphia Orchestra, and National Youth Orchestra of the United States of America.

Shaham has played the "Comtesse de Polignac", a Stradivarius violin of 1699 on loan from Stradivarius Society of Chicago, since 1989.

Discography
 Mendelssohn, Bruch: Violin Concertos (with Giuseppe Sinopoli conducting the Philharmonia Orchestra)  (1990)
 Schumann: Works for Violin and Piano (1990)
 Franck / Saint-Saëns: Violin Sonatas (with Gerhard Oppitz) (1991)
 Paganini: Violin Concerto No. 1 / Saint-Saëns: Violin Concerto No. 3 (with Giuseppe Sinopoli conducting the New York Philharmonic) (1992)
 Wieniawski: Violin Concertos Nos. 1 and 2 (with Lawrence Foster conducting the London Symphony Orchestra) (1992)
 Sibelius/Tchaikovsky: Violin Concertos (with Giuseppe Sinopoli conducting the Philharmonia Orchestra) (1993)
 Samuel Barber: Violin Concerto; Erich Wolfgang Korngold: Violin Concerto and Much Ado about Nothing Suite (with Andre Previn conducting the London Symphony Orchestra) (1994) 
 Paganini for Two (with Göran Söllscher) (1994)
 Vivaldi: The Four Seasons (with Orpheus Chamber Orchestra) (1995)
 Prokofiev: Violin Concertos Nos. 1 and 2 (with Andre Previn conducting the London Symphony Orchestra) (1996)
 Violin Romances (with Orpheus Chamber Orchestra) (1996)
 Dvořák for Two (with Orli Shaham) (1997)
 The Fiddler of the Opera (with Jascha Heifetz) (1997)
 Israel Philharmonic 60th Anniversary Gala Concert (1997)
 Berlin Gala: A Salute to Carmen (with Anne Sofie von Otter and Roberto Alagna) (1998)
 American Scenes (Works of Copland, Previn, Barber, Gershwin) (1998)
 Glazunov / Kabalevsky: Meeting in Moscow (1998)
 Bartók: Violin Concerto No. 2 (with Pierre Boulez conducting the Chicago Symphony Orchestra) (1999)
 Pärt: Tabula Rasa (1999)
 Devil's Dance (2000)
 Two Worlds (with Lee Ritenour and Dave Grusin) (2000)
 John Williams: Treesong / Violin Concerto / 3 Pieces from Schindler's List (with John Williams conducting the Boston Symphony Orchestra) (2001)
 Messiaen: Quartet for the End of Time (with Myung-Whun Chung) (2001)
 Brahms: Violin Concerto / Double Concerto (with Jian Wang and Claudio Abbado conducting the Berlin Philharmonic) (2002)
 Schubert for Two (with Göran Söllscher) (2003)
 The Fauré Album (2003)
 Prokofiev: Works for Violin and Piano (with Orli Shaham) (2004)
 Beethoven: Triple Concerto / Septet (with David Zinman and Yefim Bronfman) (2006)
 The Butterfly Lovers' Concerto for Violin / Tchaikovsky: Violin Concerto (2007)
 Mozart in Paris (with Orli Shaham) (2008)
 Elgar: Violin Concerto (with David Zinman conducting the Chicago Symphony Orcherstra) (2008)
 Tchaikovsky: Piano Trio in A Minor (with Yefim Bronfman and Truls Mørk) (2008)
 Sarasate: Virtuoso Violin Works (with Adele Anthony) (2009)
 Haydn: Violin Concertos / Mendelssohn: Octet (with the Sejong Soloists) (2010)
 Nigunim: Hebrew Melodies (with Orli Shaham) (2013)
 1930s Violin Concertos (2014)
 Bach: Sonatas and Partitas for Solo Violin  (2015)

Awards 
 Avery Fisher Career Grant (1990)
 Premio Internazionale of the Accademia Chigiana in Siena (1992)
 Grammy Award for Best Chamber Music Performance: André Previn & Gil Shaham for American Scenes (Works of Copland, Previn, Barber, Gershwin) (1999)
 Avery Fisher Award (2008) Presented by his dear friend Gustavo Dudamel at a Live from Lincoln Center private presentation of the music of Pablo de Sarasate in the Stanley H. Kaplan Penthouse.
 Instrumentalist of the Year (2012)

References

External links
 
 Gil Shaham at Canary Classics
 Gil Shaham in conversation on WGBH Radio Boston

Israeli classical violinists
American classical violinists
Male classical violinists
American male violinists
Jewish classical violinists
Jewish American classical musicians
Grammy Award winners
Juilliard School alumni
Deutsche Grammophon artists
Columbia University alumni
Horace Mann School alumni
American people of Israeli descent
People from Urbana, Illinois
1971 births
Living people
21st-century classical violinists
21st-century American male musicians
21st-century American Jews
21st-century American violinists